The 2022–23 Thai FA Cup is the 29th season of a Thailand's knockout football competition. The tournament was sponsored by Chang, and known as the Chang FA Cup for sponsorship purposes. The tournament is organized by the Football Association of Thailand. 125 clubs were accepted into the tournament, and it began with the qualification round on 21 September 2022 and concluded with the final on TBD. The winner would have qualified for the 2023–24 AFC Champions League play-off and the 2023 Thailand Champions Cup.

Calendar

Results
Note: T1: Clubs from Thai League 1; T2: Clubs from Thai League 2; T3: Clubs from Thai League 3; TA: Clubs from Thailand Amateur League.

Qualification round
There were 3 clubs from 2022–23 Thai League 2, 7 clubs from 2022–23 Thai League 3, and 16 clubs from Thailand Amateur League that have signed to qualify for 2022–23 Thai FA cup. This round had drawn on 14 September 2022. 75 goals occurred in this round.

First round
The first round would be featured 13 clubs that were the winners of the qualification round including 2 clubs from T2, 5 clubs from T3, and 6 clubs from TA and the new entries including 13 clubs from 2022–23 Thai League 2, 29 clubs from 2022–23 Thai League 3, and 41 clubs from Thailand Amateur League. This round had drawn on 14 September 2022. 210 goals occurred in this round.

Second round
The second round would be featured 48 clubs that were the winners of the first round including 13 clubs from T2, 21 clubs from T3, and 14 clubs from TA and the new entries that were 16 clubs from 2022–23 Thai League 1. This round had drawn on 10 October 2022. 138 goals occurred in this round.

Third round
The third round would be featured 32 clubs that were the winners of the second round including 13 clubs from T1, 8 clubs from T2, 8 clubs from T3, and 3 clubs from TA. This round had drawn on 8 November 2022. 71 goals occurred in this round.

Fourth round
The fourth round would be featured 16 clubs that were the winners of the third round including 9 clubs from T1, 4 clubs from T2, and 3 clubs from T3. This round had drawn on 18 January 2023. 23 goals occurred in this round.

Quarter-finals
The quarter-finals would be featured 8 clubs that were the winners of the fourth round including 7 clubs from T1 and 1 club from T2. This round had drawn on 15 February 2023. 12 goals occurred in this round.

Semi-finals
The semi-finals would be featured 4 clubs that were the winners of the quarter-finals, all are clubs from T1.

Tournament statistics

Top goalscorers

Hat-tricks

Notes: 5 = Player scored 5 goals; 4 = Player scored 4 goals; (H) = Home team; (A) = Away team

See also
 2022–23 Thai League 1
 2022–23 Thai League 2
 2022–23 Thai League 3
 2022–23 Thai League 3 Northern Region
 2022–23 Thai League 3 Northeastern Region
 2022–23 Thai League 3 Eastern Region
 2022–23 Thai League 3 Western Region
 2022–23 Thai League 3 Southern Region
 2022–23 Thai League 3 Bangkok Metropolitan Region
 2022–23 Thai League 3 National Championship
 2022–23 Thai League Cup
 2022 Thailand Champions Cup

References

External links
Thai League official website
Thai FA Cup official Facebook page

2022 in Thai football cups
Thailand FA Cup
Thailand FA Cup
Thai FA Cup seasons